Medicosma obovata is a species of shrub or small tree in the family Rutaceae and is endemic to a restricted area of far north Queensland. It has simple egg-shaped leaves with the narrower end towards the base and white flowers borne singly or in small groups in leaf axils.

Description

Taxonomy
Medicosma obovata was first formally described in 1985 by Thomas Gordon Hartley in the Australian Journal of Botany from specimens collected on Mount Dryander in 1967.

Distribution and habitat

Conservation status
This species is classified as "vulnerable" under the Australian Government Environment Protection and Biodiversity Conservation Act 1999 and the Queensland Government Nature Conservation Act 1992.

References

obovata
Sapindales of Australia
Flora of Queensland
Plants described in 1985
Taxa named by Thomas Gordon Hartley